John Moffatt may refer to:

 John Moffatt (actor) (1922–2012), English actor
 John Moffatt (physicist) (1922–2013), British physicist and academic
 John Moffatt (producer) (born 1964), American television producer, also known for his world record on a personal water craft

See also

John Moffat (disambiguation)
John Moffet (disambiguation)